Community language learning (CLL) is a language-teaching approach focused on group-interest learning.

It is based on the counselling-approach in which the teacher acts as a counselor and a paraphraser, while the learner is seen as a client and collaborator.

Background
The CLL approach was developed by Charles Arthur Curran, a Jesuit priest, professor of psychology at Loyola University Chicago, and counseling specialist. 

According to Curran, a counselor helps a client understand his or her own problems better by 'capturing the essence of the clients concern ...[and] relating [the client's] affect to cognition...'; in effect, understanding the client and responding in a detached yet considerate manner.

Methods

Natural approach

Online communities
These types of communities have recently arisen with the explosion of educational resources for language learning on the Web.

Barriers

See also
Language education
Language MOOC

References

Language-teaching methodology